Mamba is a Finnish schlager band formed in Pori in 1984.

With over 372,967 records sold, Mamba is one of the best-selling music artists in Finland.

Band members 
Current members
 Tero Vaara – vocals, guitar
 Timo Mynttinen – bass guitar
 Pete Nikkinen – keyboards
 Harri Lehtonen – drums
 Antti Snellman – saxophone

Discography

Albums 
 Mamba (1985)
 Lauantai-ilta (1986)
 Syksy (1987)
 Tunteellisella tuulella (1989)
 Pitkä vapaa (1992)
 Kummitusjuttu (1994)
 Lähdössä (1995)
 Kuume (1996)
 Kipinä (1997)
 Sodassa ja rakkaudessa (2000)
 Meille vai teille (2002)
 Joulualbumi (2003)
 Mä tein sen taas (2006)
 Toinen elämä (2008)
 Kaipuun sanomat (2009)
 Kuuma rakkaus (2011)

Compilation albums 
 Parhaat (1989)
 20 suosikkia – Mitä yhdestä särkyneestä sydämestä (1995)
 Kytkin paskana: 23 hittiä albumeilta Tuntellisella tuulella & Sydänmailla (1996)
 20 suosikkia – Pieni lemmenleikki (1997)
 Vaaran vuodet 1984–1999 (2CD, 1999)
 Vaaran vuodet 1984–1999 (4CD, 1999)
 Vaara Tero & Mamba – Suomihuiput (2003)
 Lempikappaleita 1984–2004 (2004)

DVDs 
 Konserttilavalla (2004)

References

External links 
 

Finnish schlager groups
Musical groups from Pori
Musical groups established in 1984